Allie Bethany Clifton (born January 30, 1988) is a sports journalist and former college basketball player who is currently the TV pregame host for Los Angeles Lakers telecasts on Spectrum SportsNet, after previously serving as Cleveland Cavaliers sideline reporter for Fox Sports Ohio.

Biography
Allie Bethany Clifton was born January 30, 1988. A native of Van Wert, Ohio, Clifton played college basketball for the Toledo Rockets women's basketball team from 2006–2010. After college, Clifton began her broadcasting career in Toledo as a sports reporter for ABC affiliate WTVG channel 13 before joining the Cavaliers broadcast team in 2012.

In 2017, Clifton began co-hosting the podcast Road Trippin' alongside Cavs players Richard Jefferson and Channing Frye. Many of the podcast's first shows featured Cavs players and were recorded while the team was on road trips.

In summer 2018, Clifton announced she was leaving Fox Sports Ohio and the Cavaliers to take a job hosting the pregame show on Spectrum SportsNet for Los Angeles Lakers telecasts, coinciding with LeBron James leaving the Cavaliers to sign with the Lakers.

Awards and honors
In 2018, Clifton won a pair of Lower Great Lakes Emmy Awards as a member of the Cavaliers broadcast team.

References

1988 births
Living people
Basketball announcers
Cleveland Cavaliers announcers
People from Van Wert, Ohio
Toledo Rockets women's basketball
Los Angeles Lakers announcers